U.S. Route 259 (US 259, US-259) is a north–south spur of U.S. Route 59 that runs for  through rural areas of northeast Texas and southeast Oklahoma. The highway's southern terminus is near Nacogdoches, Texas at an interchange with its parent route, US 59.

Route description

Texas
US 259 begins at an intersection with its parent, US 59 (Future Interstate 69), on the north side of Nacogdoches, Texas. The highway continues due north, passing through Mount Enterprise, and around the eastern side of Henderson and Kilgore. In Kilgore, Texas, US 259 is known as the Charles K. Devall Memorial Highway, as named by the Texas legislature. The highway continues due north, crossing Interstate 30 in northern Morris County, and crossing into Oklahoma in northwest Bowie County.

Oklahoma

After crossing into McCurtain County, Oklahoma, US-259 immediately meets up with State Highway 87, and continues north through Harris. Maps indicate that US-259 and SH-87 overlap to Idabel, but officially, this is not the case, and ODOT signage does not reflect a concurrency.

US-259 bypasses Idabel to the south and east, concurring with U.S. Highway 70 Bypass. East of Idabel, the bypass route ends, and US-259 begins a concurrency with mainline US-70 and SH-3. The three highways continue north to Broken Bow, where US-70 splits to the east toward DeQueen, Arkansas and SH-3 splits to the west, bound for Antlers. US-259 continues north alone, taking a winding path through the Ouachita Mountains of southeastern Oklahoma. The route passes Broken Bow Lake on its west side, with State Highway 259A serving as an access loop to the lake and Beavers Bend State Resort. Near the lake, US-259 crosses through the Ouachita National Forest for the first time. Near Smithville, the highway serves as the western terminus of State Highway 4.

North of the SH-4 junction, US-259 crosses into Le Flore County. The U.S. route then serves as the eastern terminus of SH-144 near Octavia. US-259 reenters the National Forest north of this junction, and intersects SH-63 at Big Cedar. It then has a junction with SH-1, the Talimena Drive.

History
In Texas, the highway was designated in 1962 and assumed the entire route of a previous iteration and alignment of State Highway 26, which was then cancelled. (The SH 26 designation has since returned, on another roadway elsewhere in the state.)

Prior to 1985, US 259 between Kilgore and Longview followed the current route of Texas State Highway 31. It entered Longview from the southwest at the intersection of South Street and Spur 63. It then followed Spur 63 to US 80. US 259 then ran concurrently with US 80 to Eastman Road. At the US 80/Eastman Rd. intersection, the previous alignment of US 259 turned left to go north on Eastman. In 1985, US 259 was rerouted to its current route along Interstate 20 to Eastman Road, then left to go north, along the eastern edge of Longview, bypassing the central business district.

Major intersections

Special routes

Kilgore business route

US-259 has one Business route in Texas.  In 2006, a new bypass was completed around the eastern side of Kilgore. The bypass had been proposed as early as 1965, but funding did not become available until the late 1990s. The new bypass was designated as US-259, while the previous route through the Kilgore business district was designated as a business route. The new business route was approved by the AASHO in September 2006.

Idabel bypass

Formerly, US-259 continued into downtown Idabel, and the southeast portion of the Idabel bypass was double-designated as US-70 Bypass and US-259 Bypass. On 6 March 2000, the bypass route was decommissioned, and mainline US-259 was moved onto the bypass. However, some bypass signage is still in place, including signage indicating the former terminus of Bypass US-259 at US-70/SH-3.

SH-259A
SH-259A, an Oklahoma state highway, is a  loop to Broken Bow Lake and Beavers Bend Resort Park north of Broken Bow, Oklahoma. It lies partially in the Ouachita National Forest and is occasionally signed as a U.S. highway.

See also

Related routes
U.S. Route 59
U.S. Route 159

References

External links

 
 Endpoints of U.S. Highway 259

59-2
59-2
59-2
2
Transportation in Nacogdoches County, Texas
Transportation in Rusk County, Texas
Transportation in Gregg County, Texas
Transportation in Upshur County, Texas
Transportation in Camp County, Texas
Transportation in Morris County, Texas
Transportation in Bowie County, Texas
Transportation in McCurtain County, Oklahoma
Transportation in Le Flore County, Oklahoma